The Szekler National Council is a NGO civic organization representing the Székelys of Romania. The organisation serves as a platform to promote Szekler autonomy.

History
The Council was founded on October 16, 2003. Its first president was József Csapó, who served until late 2006, when he resigned. Until the Council held a new presidential election in February 2008, in which Balázs Izsák emerged victorious, the president ad interim had been Imre Fodor, the former mayor of Târgu Mureş.

Doctrine

The Council wants to obtain self-government for the Székely Land. It looks to the historical fact that the Székely Seats were the traditional self-governing territorial units of the Transylvanian Székelys during medieval times. (Saxons were also organised in Seats.) The Seats were not part of the traditional Hungarian county system, and their inhabitants enjoyed a higher level of freedom (especially until the 18th century) than those living in the counties. Their autonomy was granted in return for the military services they provided to the Hungarian Kings.

The Council also claims the rights of Székelys to self-determination, as guaranteed by the Treaty of Trianon. Officially, the treaty was intended to be a confirmation of the concept of the right for self-determination of nations.

The SZNC hopes to obtain self-determination for the Székely Land on the Catalan model.

Structure

Presidents of Székely Seats and the members of the Standing Committee (SC):

Presidents of Seats 
Marosszék:	Imre Fodor
Udvarhelyszék: Béla Incze
Csíkszék: Csaba Ferencz
Gyergyószék: Károly Czirják
Bardoc-Miklósvárszék: Miklós Szabó
Sepsiszék: Barna Benedek
Orbaiszék: Botond Ferencz
Kézdiszék: László Bakk

Members of SC 
President: Balázs Izsák
Vice presidents: Emőke Benkő, Géza Borsos, Csaba Ferencz, Imre Fodor, József Gazda, Ádám Kónya, Jenő Szász, Attila Tulit, Csaba Farkas, Imre Fazakas
Rapporteurs: Pál Nagy, Árpád Andrássy, Lajos Dancs, Aladár Bod, Dávid Veress, Imre András

The Szekler National Council has 156 members and is a member of the Hungarian National Council of Transylvania.  To guarantee the representation of every Székely settlement, every settlement which has under 1500 Székely inhabitants can nominate one deputy. The Székely settlements which have over 1500 Székely inhabitants can nominate one deputy for every 3000 Székely inhabitants.

See also
 Székely autonomy movement
 Székely Land
 List of Székely settlements

Notes

External links
Official site

Hungarian organizations in Romania
Székely Land